Oglethorpe is an English surname. Notable people with the surname include:

 Anne Oglethorpe (1683–1756), British Jacobite agent
 Eleanor Oglethorpe (1662–1732, born as Eleanor Wall), Irish Jacobite agent
  Eleanor Oglethorpe de Mézières (1684–1775), English-French Jacobite
 James Oglethorpe (1696–1785), British Army general and founder of the Georgia colony
 Lewis Oglethorpe (1681–1704), English politician and soldier 
 Owen Oglethorpe (c.1502–1559), English bishop
 Theophilus Oglethorpe, Jr. (1684–1737), British politician

See also
 Oglethorpe (disambiguation)

English-language surnames